Marla Lynn Pennington (born March 5, 1954) is an American actress. She is best known for her role as Joan Anderson Lawson on Small Wonder, her last acting role to date.

Her other television credits include Soap, Diff'rent Strokes, Magnum, P.I., Charlie's Angels, Happy Days, The Incredible Hulk, and General Hospital. Pennington's film credits include National Lampoon's Class Reunion, and The Day of the Locust.

While Small Wonder was her last acting role, she appeared in a brief reunion with her co-stars on The Morning Show with Mike and Juliet on January 14, 2009. She provided commentary to the Small Wonder season 1 DVD set, released in February 2010.

In 2015, she talked about the show's 30th anniversary and explained that she had left acting after Small Wonder to have her son, Dan, and daughter, Kat, with her husband, entertainment lawyer Tom Rowan, son of comedian Dan Rowan (of Rowan and Martin fame), but wanted to get back into acting.  In 2021, her husband died, leaving her a widow.

Filmography

References

External links

Biography at smallwonder.tv

1954 births
20th-century American actresses
Living people
Actresses from Burbank, California
American film actresses
American television actresses
21st-century American women